Leonty Luk'yanovich Shamshurenkov (1687—1758) was a self-taught Russian inventor of peasant origin, who designed a device for lifting the Tsar Bell onto a bell-tower, constructed in 1752 the first self-propelling or self-running carriage (may be regarded as precursor to both quadrocycle and automobile) and proposed projects of an original odometer and self-propelling sledge.

See also 
 List of Russian inventors

References 
 Leonty Luk'yanovich Shamshurenkov 
 Коляски Шамшуренкова и самокатка Кулибина / The carriages of Shamshurenkov and samokatka of Kulibin 

Russian inventors
1687 births
1758 deaths
People from Yaransky Uyezd